Swamp Thing is an animated television series based on the Vertigo/DC Comics superhero character Swamp Thing. The series is short-lived, with the pilot episode airing on October 31, 1990 followed by four additional episodes airing weekly from April 20 to May 11, 1991. It aired on YTV from 1991 to 1993 in Canada. Produced by DIC Animation City, the series corresponded with Kenner's Swamp Thing action figure collection released in 1990. Despite the animated series' brief run, various merchandise was also produced in 1991 resulting in the only significant marketing platform ever created for the character. This is the final animated series from DC Comics to not be produced by Warner Bros. Animation.

Anton Arcane takes the role of the main villain responsible for Alec Holland's transformation into the Swamp Thing. Arcane is backed by his gang of Un-Men: Dr. Deemo, Weedkiller, and Skinman.

The Swamp Thing also has two friends named Tomahawk and Bayou Jack. Tomahawk is Native American and should not be confused with the DC/Vertigo character, Thomas Hawk, who was a soldier in the American Revolution rescued by Native Americans. Bayou Jack is a Vietnam veteran.

Similar to Troma's Toxic Crusaders, the animation style of Swamp Thing follows the trend of goofy, horror anti-heroes made for children. Spoofing Chip Taylor's "Wild Thing", the opening theme plays "Swamp Thing! ...You are amazing!"

Swamp Thing was apparently turned down by CBS, leading to its mid-season debut on FOX. Despite the series limited number of episodes, NBC featured it during Chip and Pepper's Cartoon Madness in fall 1991, and the Sci Fi Channel would syndicate it years later. The United Kingdom's Children's Channel also re-aired Swamp Thing in the 1990s.

The animated series aired concurrently with a more successful live-action adaptation of the comic book.

Cast
 Len Carlson as the Swamp Thing: Once a scientist named Alec Holland whose secret lab was destroyed by Arcane and his cronies, turning him into the Swamp Thing. He now protects the swamp from evil with his supernatural powers over nature.
 Don Francks as Anton Arcane: The evil scientist is obsessed with gaining immortality (and the cause of Swamp Thing becoming what he is) that uses the Geno-fluid of his transducer chamber to turn himself and his Un-Men into monstrous creatures. As a result, he becomes an arachnid monster.
 Harvey Atkin as Tomahawk: A Native American ally to the Swamp Thing that battles the Un-Men.
 Philip Akin as Bayou Jack: An African American Vietnam veteran and ally of the Swamp Thing and later on becomes a temporally fourth Un-Man, half-human and half mantis.
 Errol Slue as Dr. Deemo: A rhyme-speaking snake-like voodoo doctor who transforms into the fanged Serpent monster.
 Gordon Masten as Skinman: A frail, zombie-like man who transforms into the flying Fangbat monster.
 Joe Matheson as Weed Killer: A green-skinned, gas mask-wearing plant-killer that turns into the leech-like Bogsucker monster.
 Paulina Gillis as Abigail Arcane: She is the stepdaughter of the evil scientist Anton Arcane who hopes to help her friend the Swamp Thing become human again.
 Jonathan Potts as Delbert: A young boy who is a friend to J.T. and an aide to the heroes.
 Richard Yearwood as J.T.: A young boy who is a friend to Delbert and an aide to the heroes.

Episodes

Home releases
The only Swamp Thing episode available on VHS is "The Un-Men Unleashed". It was first released by Kenner in 1992 as a direct tie-in with the action figure line; its sleeve cover even borrows card art from the Snare Arm Swamp Thing figure. The second release from Buena Vista Home Video, featuring a new cover, was released in 1994.

Sterling Entertainment released Swamp Thing - Guardian of the Earth to VHS and DVD on August 31, 2004. The VHS contains three episodes of the series, while the DVD includes all five episodes of the series.

In August 2004 (later reissued in August 2006), Anchor Bay UK released all five episodes of the animated series on DVD in the United Kingdom.

Action figures
In 1990, Kenner produced a line of Swamp Thing action figures with vehicles & playsets that served as a direct counterpart to the animated series. Arcane and his Un-Men include translucent, rubbery BioMask accessories that give the effect of their transformation into monstrous creatures. Their eyes also glow-in-the-dark, a popular feature in action figures of the era. Arcane's transducer machine even includes a Mantid figure that referenced an episode where Bayou Jack is mutated. Some accessories would also be reused for Hasbro's The Original Battle Trolls in 1992.

According to an online fan source, Kenner invested approximately 6 million dollars into the Swamp Thing figure line. It also states that, according to Kenner, test results using male children between the ages of 6 and 11 showed them to be more popular than both G.I. Joe and Teenage Mutant Ninja Turtles.

It had been speculated throughout the toy collecting community that the Swamp Thing would have been included in the unproduced fourth series of Kenner's Super Powers Collection and that the Bio-Glow Swamp Thing may have been based on the prototype. This is due to the figure's swinging arm feature similar to that seen in the Super Powers Collection. Such rumors have since been refuted by the uncovering of new information regarding the proposed fourth and fifth series of the Super Powers Collection.

Series 1 (1990)
 Bio-Glow Swamp Thing
 Camouflage Swamp Thing
 Capture Swamp Thing
 Snap Up Swamp Thing
 Snare Arm Swamp Thing
 Bayou Jack
 Tomahawk
 Anton Arcane
 Dr. Deemo
 Skinman
 Weed Killer

Vehicles & playsets (1990)
 Bayou Blaster
 Bog Rover
 Marsh Buggy
 Swamp Trap
 Transducer (w/ Mantid figure)

Series 2 (1991)
 Climbing Swamp Thing

Video games and other merchandise
A Swamp Thing video game was developed for the NES and Game Boy. Both versions were released by THQ in December 1992 and were met with generally poor receptions. Also, there was a handheld game made by Tiger.

Tying in with the animated series, various Swamp Thing merchandise was produced in 1991. This included a paint by number kit, a "Battle for the Bayou" board game, a T-shirt, children's slippers, a bop bag, three pencil sharpeners, and figural chalk resembling the Swamp Thing. Perhaps an attempt to prevent consumers from confusing it as candy, the label of the chalk is especially curious with text hovering above the little figure with the words "I'm Chalk!" Much of the packaging of the Swamp Thing merchandise featured the work of comic book artist Alfredo Alcala.

References

External links
 
 TVShowsOnDVD - Swamp Thing
 Virtual Toy Chest - Swamp Thing
 VGMuseum - Swamp Thing

Animated television shows based on DC Comics
First-run syndicated television programs in the United States
Fox Broadcasting Company original programming
NBC original programming
YTV (Canadian TV channel) original programming
1990s American animated television series
1990 American television series debuts
1991 American television series endings
Television shows set in Louisiana
DC Comics action figure lines
1990s toys
Fox Kids
Swamp Thing in other media
Works by Len Wein
Television series by DIC Entertainment
American children's animated action television series
American children's animated adventure television series
American children's animated horror television series
American children's animated science fiction television series
American children's animated superhero television series